Puccinia extensicola var. hieraciata is a pathogenic fungus which is known to infect lettuce plants.

References

External links 
 Index Fungorum
 USDA ARS Fungal Database

Fungal plant pathogens and diseases
Lettuce diseases
extensicola var. hieraciata